Arianna Clarke (born 6 April 1999) is a retired Australian rules footballer who played for the Brisbane Lions in the AFL Women's.

Early life
Clarke was born in Kalgoorlie, Western Australia. At the age of 13, she moved to the Gold Coast and where she attended Robina State High School and played football for the Broadbeach Cats. She later switched to play for Coolangatta Tweed Heads in the AFL Queensland Women's League and was drafted by the Brisbane Lions with pick 15 in the 2017 AFL Women's draft.

AFLW career
Clarke was recruited by Brisbane with the number 15 pick in the 2017 AFL Women's draft. She made her debut in the Lions' round 1 game against Adelaide at Norwood Oval on 3 February 2018. In August 2020, Clarke announced her retirement after Brisbane released her from the second year of her contract.

References

External links
 

1999 births
Living people
Sportspeople from the Gold Coast, Queensland
Sportswomen from Queensland
Australian rules footballers from Queensland
Brisbane Lions (AFLW) players
People from Kalgoorlie
Australian rules footballers from Western Australia